Alexander Anthony Eist (known as Alec) BEM (26 March 1929 – 27 January 1982) was a detective at Scotland Yard during the 1960s and 1970s. He is particularly notable for the many allegations of corruption made against him. These included complicity in jewel robberies and providing false alibis to criminals. He later provided testimony to the United States House Select Committee on Assassinations regarding the assassination of Martin Luther King, whose killer – James Earl Ray – had been in his custody following Ray's escape to London in 1968.

Eist served in the Merchant Navy during the Second World War, for which he was decorated. As a policeman, he was awarded the British Empire Medal for bravery in 1968, following his disarming of a man with a rifle. Despite the allegations of corruption that followed him for much of his career – and resulted in his being returned to uniform police duties before retirement and then facing a failed prosecution after it – Eist was never convicted of any such crimes. Throughout his career, Eist was awarded several decorations for conduct and bravery. Following his retirement, he ran the 'Green Man' pub in Six Mile Bottom, Cambridgeshire.

Early life and career

Alec Eist was born in Cardiff on 26 September 1929. He joined the Merchant Navy as an Able Seaman around the time the Second World War was ending in Europe in May 1945. Having served for nearly three years, Eist joined the Metropolitan Police as a constable in June 1948.

British Empire Medal

In 1967, Eist, then a sergeant based in Cheshunt, was awarded the British Empire Medal for bravery in single-handedly disarming an armed suspect. On 14 February that year, The London Gazette reported that following a series of reported robberies, the suspect's car was spotted, with Eist being one of a number of officers called in to provide backup. A man with a rifle was observed in the property's basement, subsequently escaping into the back garden, where he proceeded to sit on a wall and threaten to shoot the officers if they approached.

Eist recognised the man as an escaped prisoner who, according to the Gazette, was known for being criminal. The man jumped into an adjacent garden, continuing to threaten the policemen, who in return threw flowerpots at him. Cornered at the end of the garden, the man pointed his rifle at each of the officers and threatened to fire if they approached; despite this, both Eist and a colleague tackled the man and disarmed him. The rifle was found to be loaded with three .22-calibre bullets with a fourth in the breech.

Career in the Flying Squad
In May 1968 Eist joined the Flying Squad under Harold "Tanky" Challenor and was swiftly promoted to detective sergeant (second class). Eist eventually reached the rank of Detective Chief Inspector. He was appointed—with Chief Superintendent James Marshall—head of the Wembley Robbery Squad, where they encountered Bertie Smalls, head of the Wembley Mob. Eist had an in-depth and extensive knowledge and understanding of both London's underworld and the geography it occupied. The gangster Freddie Foreman described Eist as a "rebel cop", who would get drunk and stand on pub tables singing. The police historian Dick Kirby describes Eist as "always controversial", as was his relationship with senior offices. In an anecdote from Eist's tenure at Holloway:

Involvement in the investigation into the assassination of Martin Luther King

In May 1968, following his assassination of Martin Luther King, James Earl Ray fled to London. On 8 June Ray was arrested at London Heathrow Airport attempting to leave for Brussels on a false Canadian passport. Ray was placed in the personal custody of Eist, first being held at Canon Row Police Station and then in Wandsworth Prison. Eist spent the first nine hours of Ray's custody with him in Canon Row, and whenever Ray was taken to the Old Bailey, they were handcuffed together. Eist later recalled how, "initially, [Ray] didn't want to say anything to anybody", merely glaring at Eist. Eist thought that, probably because of their constant contact, Ray "began to look on me as somebody he could talk to". Eist helped Ray acclimatise to the British prison service, for example, by arranging for him to receive cutlery—which had initially been withheld in his custody for fear of suicide—and bringing him magazines. Ray's later biographer, Gerald Posner, believes that, on account of these niceties, "slowly the two developed a rapport, rare for Ray with anyone". Eist later recalled that, even so, Ray would not respond to specific questions, preferring to talk in generalities. When Eist told Ray that the death of King had made little impact in Britain, Ray's response, said Eist, was "you haven't seen anything yet".

Throughout Ray's subsequent extradition, trial and sentencing, US authorities were unaware of Eist's involvement with Ray. Eist had discussed it with various colleagues and companions over the years, but it was not until 1976 he met a USAF officer then resident in London; Eist mentioned his association with Ray, and the officer advised him to contact the FBI. By then, there was a new investigation into the association planned by Congress.

Testimony to the HSCA
Two years after his retirement, Eist testified under oath to the United States House Select Committee on Assassinations (HSCA) on 9 November 1976 – its first day of public evidence – that Ray had mentioned disposing of a gun on account of how Ray "had seen a policeman or police vehicle and thrown the gun away." According to Posner, Eist's testimony "caught Ray and his then-attorney Mark Lane by surprise". The journalist Pat McMichael has speculated that because Eist and/or his evidence were unknown and unsuspected in America, his evidence was "particularly damaging". The Observer wrote at the time that Eist's evidence was the "biggest blow" to Ray. Eist testified as to Ray's blatant racism: not only did Ray refer to African-Americans with ethnic slurs, Eist said, but "he also told me that he tried to get into Africa at some stage – he said to kill more of them". Eist also reported that, while in British custody, Ray "seemed quite elated" – "brimming with confidence" – particularly as he believed he would receive payouts for television and media appearances.

Then-chief crime reporter for the Daily Mail, Owen Summers, provided a character witness for Eist at the HSCA, in which he told the committee that he had known Eist for over 18 years and had "never been knowingly misled by Alec Eist and always found his information totally reliable". One of the House Committee members, Chris Dodd, however, said he was "extremely disturbed" that Eist had not come forward with his evidence regarding Ray when the HSCA re-opened its investigations in 1977. Eist's answer – "in clipped tones" – was that he had been entangled in domestic affairs, namely his recent trial for corruption.

Summers also disputed Dodd's charge that Eist had remained silent regarding Ray. Eist, stated Summers, had told him 10 years previously, saying that he remembered Eist telling him that Ray had "coughed" to Dr King's killing. In Eist's defence, argued Summers, he had not submitted it as he believed that his paper would not consider it newsworthy. Eist claimed that he had taken the advice of his American contact in Britain and reported it to the FBI's London station; however, the House Committee noted that it had failed to discover any records of Eist's report.

Informants and accusations of corruption
Eist made liberal use of informants within the criminal community. Among his informers, he counted men such as Roy Garner, who was later convicted of smuggling cocaine, and became both a supergrass and a millionaire. Eist tried to avoid making appearances in court wherever possible but would ensure that reward payments always included his informant's 10%. He often attended to it personally, although Kirby describes it as "questionable if the fee in its entirety was handed over to the snout".

Eist has been described as either "the most corrupt or the best informed" Scotland Yard detective of his generation, argues the investigative journalist Martin Fido, noting how Eist "reputedly offered a sliding tariff of payments". These payments would be in return for him dropping or otherwise failing investigations (although drawing the line, says Fido, at murder and rape). The Guardian journalist Paul Lashmar has described Eist as "by reputation the most corrupt Yard officer of the 1950s to mid-1970s which was no small achievement in such a packed field".

Likewise, the intelligence scholar Duncan Campbell suggests that Eist was "one of the most active bent officers" of the period. Kirby also suggests that "Eist's probity was also questionable", and describes occasions on which individuals were arrested for crimes that his informers had committed. Reg Dudley – a North London "career criminal" who was wrongfully convicted of double murder in 1977 – was a fence during the 1960s and had, he wrote, a "close relationship" with Eist, whom he calls "bent". Dudley asserts that "for a few grand channelled through [Dudley], Alec would do what he could to make evidence 'disappear'". Kirby asserts that Eist was close enough to Dudley and other villains of the day to socialise with. He notes a contemporary of Eist's at Holloway saying that an "obvious...surveillance photo" existed of various London gangsters on a cruise ship, where "skulking in the shadows one could see the unmistakable features of Alec Eist". Eist has been alleged to also have had links to the perpetrators of the Baker Street robbery, obstructed some of the prosecutions, and later been paid off with jewellery from the robbery's proceeds.

Accusations of corruption also bogged down Eist's appearance before the HSCA. His evidence was questioned by Ray's defence attorney Mark Lane. Lane told the committee that Eist had been "dismissed in disgrace" from Scotland Yard, and cited charges of corruption, perjury and robbery: "if you knew of this man's background, you have done a disservice to the American people by raising the charges" he argued, and considered that accepting Eist's evidence at face value amounted to "perhaps the most outrageous thing this committee has ever done".

After the hearing, Lane told journalists that, although he only knew what he did from a British lawyer to whom he had spoken on the phone, the lawyer believed Eist "was possibly the most corrupt man in the modern history of Scotland Yard". Eist rejected Lane's assertions, describing them as "absolutely untrue". Contemporaneous news reports describe the House Committee as being divided on whether to accept Eist's evidence.

Eist said, "I live in a very small village and this is crucifying me". He suggested that Lane's allegations were a defence strategy to shift culpability for King's assassination onto the FBI, who, Eist said, "could not have acted more honourably to get that man brought to justice" and that "absolutely no way" had they been involved.

However, although Lane accused Eist of having stood trial for bribery and having been suspected of involvement in jewel robberies across England, Eist was only ever charged on one count involving a false alibi and perverting the course of justice. This charge had been dropped as the name of the arresting officer had been mistaken as Eist, and the judge – instructing the jury to bring in a verdict of not guilty – said "I have come to the conclusion that there is no evidence to link him with any of the counts in which his name appears". He was released immediately and the British government paid for his defence.

Later life
One of Eist's last high-profile successes came in January 1975 when he was commended for "outstanding diligence and detective ability leading to the arrest and conviction of an active and violent gang of robbers". On this occasion, he was also commended at the Old Bailey and by the Director of Public Prosecutions.

The arrival of Ernie Millen as Chief Superintendent of the Flying Squad led to procedural and philosophical changes: no longer could officers arrest stooges in place of their own informants, and the practice of arresting criminals in the act but letting ones' informants at the scene escape was also quashed. This was a new practice that, Kirby argues, must have caused "considerable unease" to officers such as Eist. The author Gordon Bowers describes Eist as being "under a cloud" over alleged corruption in the last years of his career, for which he was investigated by Detective Chief Inspector Alan Rattray, although no charges were brought. 

Eist was returned to uniformed police duties in 1975, with responsibility for monitoring traffic wardens. Officers involved in Operation Countryman – the investigation into corruption within the Metropolitan Police instigated by Sir Robert Mark in 1978 – believed Eist to have received jewels from the Baker Street robbery, and in 1980 one of those arrested for the crime, Mickey Gervaise, named Eist as an accessory.

Over the course of Eist's 28-year career, he was awarded somewhere between 13 and 28 commendations. With Dudley now arrested and facing a murder trial, Eist was placed on 90-days' sick leave. Eist retired on 26 February 1976 on medical grounds rather than through criminal charges or accusations. Kirby describes his mental health as being, by then, "fragile". He opened a pub, the Green Man, in Six Mile Bottom, Cambridgeshire, where he died on 27 Jan 1982.

In 2002, three of Eist's medals – the BEM, his War Medal 1939–1945 and the Police Exemplary Service Medal – were auctioned in London. Estimated at between £300 and £400, they sold for £1200, (now £).

Posthumous allegations
Allegations of corruption continued to emerge after Eist's death. In a May 1982 investigation by The Observer, the paper cited the 1970s gangster Joe Cannon as having "significant evidence" against Eist, who Cannon also accused of personally robbing him of £200 in cash. Freddie Foreman later suggested that Eist "used to invite villains to his promotion parties" in hotels such as the Dorchester, where Eist would warn the attendees of any approaching police attention that he was aware of, Foreman claimed. Criminals involved in such high-profile raids as the 1980 silver bullion robbery also made allegations against Eist. One, Michael Gervaise, made the "startling allegation" to a court in 1982 Eist was one of several high-ranking police officers bribed and who had "actively participated in robberies as part of [Gervais'] gang". Freddie Foreman, recalling how Eist persuaded Foreman and his gang against carrying out an armed robbery, said in his view Eist could

Notes

References

Bibliography

 
 
 
 
 
 
 
 
 
 
 
 
 
 
 
 
 
 
 
 
 
 
 
 
 
 
 
 
 
 
 
 
 

1929 births
Recipients of the British Empire Medal
Police misconduct in England
Metropolitan Police officers
British Merchant Navy personnel of World War II
1982 deaths